Sphaeropteris is a genus of tree fern in the family Cyatheaceae. It has been treated as a subgenus within the genus Cyathea, but is accepted in the Pteridophyte Phylogeny Group classification of 2016 (PPG I).

Description
The stalk (stipe) of the frond is strawlike or purple in colour, with pale to brown scales. The sori (spore-bearing structures) are rounded, with or without indusia (covers).

Sphaeropteris is now separated from the other genera in the family Cyatheaceae primarily on the basis of molecular phylogenetic studies. However, the scales on the stalks (petioles) provide a morphological distinction. Sphaeropteris has scales without distinct margins, whereas the other genera have scales with distinct margins.

Taxonomy
The genus Sphaeropteris was erected by Johann Jakob Bernhardi in 1801. It is placed in the family Cyatheaceae. The division of the family into genera has had a long and controversial history. Three or four clades have been suggested based on molecular phylogenetic studies. The Pteridophyte Phylogeny Group classification of 2016 (PPG I) accepts three genera, related as shown in the cladogram below. Sphaeropteris is sister to the remaining members of the family.

Older sources, such as the New Zealand Organisms Register , place Sphaeropteris within a very broadly defined Cyathea.

Phylogeny
, the Checklist of Ferns and Lycophytes of the World accepted the following species:

Phylogeny of Sphaeropteris
 

 
Other species include:

Sphaeropteris agatheti  (Holtt.) R.M.Tryon
Sphaeropteris albidosquamata  (Rosenst.) R.M.Tryon
Sphaeropteris albosetacea  (Bedd.) R.M.Tryon
Sphaeropteris angustipinna  (Holtt.) R.M.Tryon
Sphaeropteris aramaganensis  (Kaneh.) R.M.Tryon
Sphaeropteris arthropoda  (Copel.) R.M.Tryon
Sphaeropteris assimilis  (Hook.) R.M.Tryon
Sphaeropteris binuangensis  (Alderw.) R.M.Tryon
Sphaeropteris carrii  (Holtt.) R.M.Tryon
Sphaeropteris curranii  (Copel.) R.M.Tryon
Sphaeropteris discophora  (Holtt.) R.M.Tryon
Sphaeropteris elliptica  (Copel.) R.M.Tryon
Sphaeropteris fugax  (Alderw.) R.M.Tryon
Sphaeropteris fusca  (Bak.) R.M.Tryon
Sphaeropteris inaequalis  (Holtt.) R.M.Tryon
Sphaeropteris insularum  (Holtt.) R.M.Tryon
Sphaeropteris integra  (J.Sm.) R.M.Tryon
Sphaeropteris intramarginalis Windisch
Sphaeropteris ledermannii (Brause) Tryon
Sphaeropteris leucolepis  (Mett.) R.M.Tryon
Sphaeropteris leucotricha  (Christ) R.M.Tryon
Sphaeropteris lockwoodiana  P.G.Windisch
Sphaeropteris macarenensis  (Alston) R. Tryon
Sphaeropteris magna  (Copel.) R.M.Tryon
Sphaeropteris mollicula  (Maxon) R. Tryon
Sphaeropteris moseleyi  (Bak.) R.M.Tryon
Sphaeropteris obliqua  (Copel.) R.M.Tryon
Sphaeropteris obscura  (Scort.) R.M.Tryon
Sphaeropteris papuana  (Ridl.) R.M.Tryon
Sphaeropteris parianensis  P.G.Windisch
Sphaeropteris parksiae  (Copel.) R.M.Tryon
Sphaeropteris parvifolia  (Holtt.) R.M.Tryon
Sphaeropteris parvipinna  (Holtt.) R.M.Tryon
Sphaeropteris pukuana  (M.Kato) Lehnert & Coritico
Sphaeropteris robinsonii  (Copel.) R.M.Tryon
Sphaeropteris sarasinorum  (Holtt.) R.M.Tryon
Sphaeropteris senex  (Alderw.) R.M.Tryon
Sphaeropteris sibuyanensis  (Copel.) R.M.Tryon
Sphaeropteris stipitipinnula  (Holtt.) R.M.Tryon
Sphaeropteris strigosa  (Christ) R.M.Tryon
Sphaeropteris subsessilis  (Copel.) R.M.Tryon
Sphaeropteris suluensis  (Bak.) R.M.Tryon
Sphaeropteris teysmannii  (Copel.) R.M.Tryon
Sphaeropteris tomentosa  (Bl.) R.M.Tryon
Sphaeropteris trichophora  (Copel.) R.M.Tryon
Sphaeropteris vaupelii  (Copel.) R.M.Tryon
Sphaeropteris verrucosa  (Holtt.) R.M.Tryon
Sphaeropteris wallacei  (Mett. ex Kuhn) R.M.Tryon
Sphaeropteris womersleyi  (Holtt.) R.M.Tryon
Sphaeropteris zamboangana  (Copel.) R.M.Tryon

Distribution and habitat
The native distribution of the genus Sphaeropteris extends from southern China down through eastern tropical Asia to New Zealand, with a separate area in Central America and north-western South America. Some species are also naturalized in Africa and western Australia.

Species of Sphaeropteris are large plants and require space to grow. They usually prefer less shaded conditions than species of Alsophila. They are found in rain forests and tropical montane forests, often in clearings or on the margins, from the canopy layer down to the understorey layer. They are also found in ravines, swamps and disturbed areas.

References

 
Fern genera